Step Up Revolution (released in some countries as Step Up 4: Miami Heat) is a 2012 American 3D dance film directed by Scott Speer (in his feature film directorial debut) and written by Amanda Brody. It serves as a sequel to  Step Up 3D and the fourth installment in the Step Up film series. The film stars Ryan Guzman, Kathryn McCormick, Misha Gabriel, Cleopatra Coleman, Stephen "tWitch" Boss, Tommy Dewey, and Peter Gallagher.

Step Up Revolution was released in the United States on July 27, 2012, by Summit Entertainment, through conventional 2D and 3D formats. It became the first film in the series to not be co-produced by Touchstone Pictures nor distributed by Walt Disney Studios Motion Pictures and the first film to be released by Summit after being acquired by Lions Gate Entertainment in January 2012. The film received mixed reviews from critics.

A sequel, Step Up: All In, was released on August 8, 2014, in the United States.

Plot

In Miami, Florida, a flash mob, later identified as "The Mob", shuts down Ocean Drive briefly by cutting off the streets with retro convertibles and dancing on cars to music blasted by DJ Penelope (Cleopatra Coleman).

A few hours later, Sean Asa (Ryan Guzman), Eddy (Misha Gabriel), and Jason Hardlerson (Stephen "tWitch" Boss), the leaders of The Mob, watch their latest flashmob air on the television news in a restaurant kitchen of the Dimont Hotel where they work as waiters. A few complain about their public disturbance, while others praise it. After they get off work, the group sneak into the hotel's beach club, claiming to be guests, not employees.

Meanwhile, across the club at the bar, Emily Anderson (Kathryn McCormick) tries to get a bartender's attention, but ends up preparing her own beer. Sean, who is immediately smitten by her, asks for a beer with Emily telling him it's on the house, then heads down to the beach to dance, resulting in a dance battle between the two, but ending with Emily suddenly running off when she sees one of her dad's business partners, Trip.

The next day, Emily and her father William "Bill" Anderson (Peter Gallagher) argue over breakfast at the Dimont Hotel. Sean, their waiter, immediately recognizes her, but Emily accidentally spills orange juice. Sean helps clean it up then leaves to fetch her another juice.

While he's gone, Emily continues to argue with her father before storming off. Sean later finds her in the hotel's ballroom, where Emily begins a fast contemporary dance, oblivious to Sean's presence. After Emily notices Sean and warms up to him, she explains to him that she's trying to nail an audition for the prestigious Winwood Dance Academy Company. Sean advises her to incorporate faster, more interesting moves, but Emily declines, saying that there are rules. Sean, in turn, tells her to break the rules, giving her an address and telling her to come there. Emily does and finds herself at the Miami Museum of Fine Arts, where the paintings and statues come to life, which is the work of The Mob. By telling her to attend, Sean basically reveals to her his participation in The Mob.

The next day, Emily persuades Sean to let her take part in their next flash mob, which is scheduled to hit a restaurant the following week. Eddy immediately dislikes Emily, giving her the lead to test her. Sean then introduces her to "the gang" where she meets Eddy (The Hacker), Penelope (The DJ), Jason Hardlerson (The FX), and Mercury (The Artist), who never talks. Sean also explains that they are trying to win a contest through YouTube by getting 10 million hits on the site.

The flash mob goes well and Eddy admits that Emily did great. The two then celebrate at Ricky's, where Sean and Emily salsa together, much to everyone's delight. Sean and Emily then sneak onto a boat and sail down the river. There, they bond over their mothers both not being a part of their lives, and they kiss and sleep on the boat until morning.

When they hurry back to Ricky's, which turns out to be owned by Sean's uncle Ricky, Ricky reveals to them that Emily's dad, a building tycoon, is planning to develop the strip, destroying Ricky's bar, Sean's home, Sean's sister's home and workplace, and many other things.

Enraged, Emily storms off to talk to her father, with Sean following behind her. Emily wants to tell The Mob who her dad is, but is reluctantly convinced by Sean not to and instead finds out from her dad that there will be a meeting to determine whether the project to develop the strip goes through or not. Emily convinces the rest of The Mob to protest the plans. Their dance is a huge hit, gaining the group over a million more views.

Eddy finds out that Emily is William's daughter through watching a tape of Sean and Emily rehearsing where she reveals the truth, without knowing that they are being recorded. Enraged, he reveals Emily's complicity with The Mob to William through a protest flash mob. This ruins everything when Emily feels betrayed by Sean and he gets arrested for saving Eddy after a fight between the two.

Emily had rehearsed her Winwood audition piece as a duet with Sean, but now that she and Sean are estranged, Emily no longer has him as a dance partner. Instead, she adapts the piece, dancing it as a solo performance. The result falls flat and she fails her audition for the troupe. Sean finally meets Emily, still hurting from the humiliation, and tells him she is going back to work for her dad, per a promise she made with her dad that if she did not become a professional dancer by the end of the summer that she would work with him back in Cleveland.

After Sean and Eddy were sent to jail for being caught in the flash mob, Ricky bails them out. Sean ends his friendship with Eddy for destroying his relationship with Emily, knowing how much of a grudge he holds towards her father for firing him. Getting a pep talk from Ricky, Eddy and Sean make up for the wrongdoings they both made on each other. Together with the Mob again, they plan one more performance. No longer a contest, but a voice to be heard.

The final flash mob is aimed at the development's public announcement, with the help of members from The House of Pirates, including Moose (Adam Sevani), Vladd, Hair, and Jenny Kido. Sean and Emily then perform the original audition piece. Seeing his daughter so happy, William decides to build the community up rather than tear it down. Reconciled, Sean and Emily kiss passionately and make up, and Sean and Eddy make a deal with the owner of the marketing firm that represents Nike for the Mob to dance in their commercials.

Cast
 Ryan Guzman  as Sean Asa, Emily's love interest and the leader of the Mob.
 Kathryn McCormick as Emily Anderson, Sean's love interest, a gifted dancer and a Rookie member of Mob 
 Misha Gabriel as Eddy, Sean's best friend who co-leads the Mob with Sean. He, Sean, and Jason work as waiters at the Dimont Hotel, but he gets fired by William for being late to work one day, which fuels his aggression towards him.
 Peter Gallagher as William "Bill" Anderson, a real-estate tycoon and Emily's father, as well as Sean and Eddy's boss.
 Stephen "tWitch" Boss as Jason Hardlerson, a member of the Mob and the Pirates as he was in the 3rd movie and had returned to Miami after being in New York.
 Tommy Dewey as Trip, William's protegé
 Cleopatra Coleman as DJ Penelope
 Megan Boone as Claire, Sean's sister who is a single mother with a young daughter
 Adam Sevani as Robert "Moose" Alexander III. He makes a cameo in the film, Moose gets a call from Jason to come to Miami and help him and the Mob which he does and brings some of the Pirates.
 Chadd "Madd Chadd" Smith as Vladd. He makes a cameo, also a member of the Pirates, his character appears with Moose and Jenny Kido in the final dance scene.
 Seyfo Franklin Bass "Glitch" is in the Mob
 Sean Rahill as Iris
 Mari Koda as Jenny Kido. She makes a cameo, her character appears with the rest of The Pirates along with Moose. 
 Chris Scott as Hair. He makes a cameo, his character appears with the rest of The Pirates along with Moose.
 Brendan Morris as Neighborhood Kid / Dancer (also part of the Mob) 
 Phillip "Pacman" Chbeeb in The Mob
 RayNeshia Robinson in the mob
 Justin "Jet Li" Valles in the Mob
 Glenn Michael A. Mataro in the Mob
 Celestina Aladekoba in the Mob
 Angeline Fioridella Appel in the Mob
 Natali Reznick in the Mob
 Mia Michaels as Olivia
 Tangi Colombel as Ballet Master
 Bebo in the Mob
 Blonde Paint Girl
 Tony Bellissmo in the Mob
 Sean "Tsunami" Rivera in the Mob

Soundtrack

Production technology
Step Up Revolution was filmed in "native" / "true 3D" without post production conversion using Red Epic cameras, Zeiss Ultra Prime and Angenieux Optimo DP Lenses and 3ality Technica TS-5 camera rigs and Stereo Image Processor (SIP) technology systems.

Reception
Step Up Revolution received a 41% approval rating on the review aggregator Rotten Tomatoes based on 98 reviews, with an average rating of 5.00/10. The consensus stating: "Step Up Revolution treads familiar territory by surrounding its lively and kinetic dance sequences with a predictably generic story." It holds a rating of 43/100 on Metacritic signifying mixed or average reviews.

In its opening weekend, the film grossed $11,731,708 and was placed at No. 4 on the Box Office. The film was released in 2,567 theaters. As of November 19, 2012 the film has grossed $35,074,677 in the United States and $105,396,069 in other territories, for a total of $140,470,746 worldwide. As of November 19, 2012, it lies third in terms of worldwide box-office receipts compared to other films in the Step Up series.

References

External links
 
 
 
 
 

2012 films
2012 3D films
2012 romantic drama films
American dance films
American musical drama films
American romantic drama films
American romantic musical films
American sequel films
2010s English-language films
Step Up (film series)
Films set in Miami
Films shot in Miami
2010s hip hop films
Summit Entertainment films
Films directed by Scott Speer
Films scored by Aaron Zigman
2012 directorial debut films
2010s American films